Mary Morrissey may refer to:

 Mary Manin Morrissey, founder of the Living Enrichment Center
 Mary A. Morrissey (born 1957), member of the Vermont House of Representatives
Mary Morrissey (born 1957), Irish novelist and short story writer